Nashua Transit System provides public transit services for the city of Nashua, New Hampshire, located just on the outskirts of suburban Boston. NTS, also known as CityBus, provides eleven scheduled bus routes to major city destinations, and Citylift operates the paratransit service. In 2004, Metro Magazine named NTS as "one of the 10 Most Improved Transit Systems" in the United States.

CityBus routes
Routes run from 6:15 am to 7:00 pm Monday to Friday, with limited service on Saturdays (2A and 6A do not run on Saturdays).

Scheduled bus routes:
1 French Hill/Greeley Park
2 Amherst St./Dartmouth/Westside Plaza
2A Amherst St./Walmart/Westside Plaza
3 Canal St./Marketplace Plaza
5 Lake St.-Northeastern Blvd.
6/6A South End/Pheasant Lane Mall
7 Crown Hill/Spring St.
8 Nashua Mall/Pine Hill
12 Lake St./Harris Rd.

Citylift
Citylift is a demand responsive transport system, providing shared rides to those with a disability under the Americans with Disabilities Act or who are more than 60 years old.

After-7 service
Nashua Transit System provides passengers with three routes after normal business hours. These routes run from 7 pm to 11 pm, Monday to Friday, with limited service on Saturdays.

 Central: French Hill-Broad St.
 North: North End-Amherst St.
 South: South End-Pheasant Lane Mall

See also
Fares and passes
Citylift and Senior Services

References
Nashua Transit official website

Bus transportation in New Hampshire
Nashua, New Hampshire
Transportation in Hillsborough County, New Hampshire